The 1993 Senior British Open was a professional golf tournament for players aged 50 and above and the seventh Senior British Open, held from 22 to 25 July at Royal Lytham & St Annes Golf Club in Lytham St Annes, Lancashire, England, United Kingdom.

In 2018, the tournament was, as all Senior British Open Championships played 1987–2002, retroactively recognized as a senior major golf championship and a PGA Tour Champions (at the time named the Senior PGA Tour) event.

Bob Charles, with a birdie on the last hole, won by one stroke over Tommy Horton and Gary Player, to win his second Senior British Open title and second senior major championship victory. Charles won The Open Championship on the same course 30 years earlier, in 1963.

Venue 

The event was the third Senior Open Championship in a row held at Royal Lytham & St Annes Golf Club.

Field
123 players entered the competition. Two of them withdraw and one was disqualified. 66 players, 56 professionals and ten amateurs, made the 36-hole cut.

Joel Hirsch, United States, finished leading amateur on fifth place.

Past champions in the field
Four past Senior British Open champions participated. All of them made the 36-hole cut, Bob Charles (won), Gary Player (tied 2nd), John Fourie (8th) and Bobby Verway (tied 25th). 1987 champion Neil Coles did not play.

Past winners and runners-up at The Open Championship in the field 
The field included three former winners of The Open Championship. All of them made the cut, Bob Charles (won), Gary Player (tied 2nd) and Arnold Palmer (tied 13th).

The field also included two former runners-up at The Open Championship; Brian Huggett (tied 5th) and Christy O'Connor Snr (tied 9th).

Final results 
Sunday, 25 July 1993

(a) denotes amateur, who did not receive any prize money.

Source:

References

External links 
 Results on European Tour website

Senior major golf championships
Golf tournaments in England
Senior British Open
Senior British Open
Senior British Open